These are the official results of the Men's Triple Jump event at the 1993 IAAF World Championships in Stuttgart, Germany. There were a total number of 46 participating athletes, with two qualifying groups and the final held on Monday 1993-08-16.

Final

Qualifying round
Held on Sunday 1993-08-15 with the mark set at 17.10 metres (4 + 9 athletes)

See also
 1991 Men's World Championships Triple Jump
 1992 Men's Olympic Triple Jump
 1995 Men's World Championships Triple Jump

References
 Results

T
Triple jump at the World Athletics Championships